Monotoca submutica, commonly known as mountain broomheath, is an endemic heath family shrub in the Epacridaceae family and is one of 17 species in the genus Monotoca. It is a widespread and locally common small to tall woody dense shrub found in the alpine/subalpine woodlands of southern and western mountains of Tasmania, Australia.

Description 
Monotoca submutica is an erect, dense and compact shrub, usually occurring as a small/medium shrub (1-3m high as a shrub) or when associated with wet sclorphyll forests it can grow as a small woody tree (up to 6m). Leaves are suberect and shaped from elliptical through to oblong/obovate (6-12mm long and 2-3.5mm wide), leaf margins are slightly recurved with a green flat or slightly convex adaxial surface and glaucous abaxial surface. The flowers are white and often solitarily arranged axillary, but can also be arranged in short spikes with 2-4 flowers. In most cases individuals are dioecious, with the main difference between female and male flowers being that the male flowers have their anthers half exserted. Immature fruit is spherical/oval and green, matured drupe turns to red/orange. Flowering occurs from September through to October. A distinguishing feature of Monotoca submutica is that the leaf apex is mucronate and not sharp.

Distribution and habitat 
Monotoca submutica is endemic to Tasmania. It is a widespread species in southern and western Tasmania, where it is found in subalpine forests and woodlands as a small to medium shrub. In wet sclerophyll forests that are associated with rainforests, it can occur as a small tree (up to 6m). On the east coast of Tasmania in the Freycinet Peninsula, a more robust form of the typical Monotoca submutica is known to occur.

Cultivation 
Monotoca submutica is not a commonly grown and cultivated species, would do best in well drained, moist soil with moderate sunlight.

References 

submutica
Flora of Tasmania